Zhang Xinyan (born 9 February 1994) is a Chinese  runner competing in the 3000 metres steeplechase.

She represented her country at the 2015 World Championships in Beijing without qualifying for the final. She participated in the 2016 Summer Olympics.

Competition record

Personal bests
Outdoor
5000 metres – 15:51.37 (Shenyang 2013)
10,000 metres – 34:14.17 (Zhaoqing 2013)
3000 metres steeplechase – 9:28.54（luoyang 2016）

References

External links

http://skechersgorunla.com/our-runners/zhang-xinyan/
http://www.bestchinanews.com/Sports/8736.html
https://www.iaaf.org/news/report/chinese-cross-country-championships-2015-zhan
http://arrsd.auguszt.in/runner/37399
http://www.gettyimages.com/photos/zhang-xinyan?excludenudity=true&sort=mostpopular&mediatype=photography&phrase=zhang%20xinyan

1994 births
Living people
Chinese female steeplechase runners
World Athletics Championships athletes for China
Athletes (track and field) at the 2016 Summer Olympics
Athletes (track and field) at the 2018 Asian Games
Olympic athletes of China
Chinese female cross country runners
Asian Games competitors for China